The Ness Ziona Stadium, is a football stadium in Ness Ziona, Israel. It is the home stadium of Sektzia Nes Tziona.

Sport in Ness Ziona
Football venues in Israel
Sports venues in Central District (Israel)
Sports venues completed in 2001